Lim Hyo-sook (born 26 April 1982) is a South Korean volleyball player. She was part of the team at the 2012 Summer Olympics.

References

External links
 Profile at FIVB.org

1982 births
Living people
South Korean women's volleyball players
Volleyball players at the 2012 Summer Olympics
Olympic volleyball players of South Korea